Brulkin's Manor House is a building of the historical significance in Pushkin, Saint Petersburg. It was built in 1810. Nowadays it is an object of cultural heritage. The building is located on 24, 26/8 Srednaya Street.

History 
The first house on the site was built in 1746 according to the project of SI Chevakinsky. A new house on the corner of the streets (present house 26/8) with a brick first floor and a wooden second floor is built (possibly rebuilt) in the 1810s. At the same time, a one-story brick outbuilding, the present house, was built. The likely architect of the houses is VP Stasov. It is known that in 1857 the houses belonged to the widow of the merchant MI Yashumova. In 1877, for the new owner, the out-of-town councilor IA Brylkin, according to the project of architect N.S. Nikitin, the wing was set up on the second floor, and the main house was expanded. At the beginning of the 20th century, the house belonged to NA Tiran, and in it the Tsarskoye Selo Social Assembly was established. After the Great Patriotic War the former main house was rebuilt: a wooden second floor was demolished, instead of it a stone one was built.

Architecture 
The main house is built in the style of classicism. The most characteristic is a rounded corner with a triple window, which after reconstruction in stone was reproduced, but was supplemented with a balcony. After the perestroika, the outbuilding acquired the decoration in the spirit of eclecticism. It had a complex roof with a turret-turret and decorative vases in the corners, but these features have since been removed.

References

Literature

Sources 
 
 
 

Buildings and structures in Pushkin
Cultural heritage monuments in Saint Petersburg